The Luxembourg men's national basketball team represents Luxembourg in international basketball tournaments. They are controlled by the Luxembourg Basketball Federation.

Luxembourg has competed at the EuroBasket three times, in 1946, 1951, and 1955. Their best result was an eighth place finish at their first appearance at the competition in 1946. However, the national team has yet to qualify to compete at the FIBA World Cup.

History

EuroBasket 1946
Luxembourg appeared in their first international event at EuroBasket 1946 in Geneva. After being placed in Group A for the preliminary round, the national team would play in their first ever match against Poland, where the team would lose 45–28. Following the defeat, Luxembourg went on to lose their next two matches against Hungary and Italy, which ultimately dropped the team into the classification phase of the tournament. There, Luxembourg captured their first ever victory against England 27–50. With only one game remaining for Luxembourg, the team would finish out the competition with a loss against Belgium, to end the tournament eighth out of the ten teams overall.

EuroBasket 1951
After not entering the competition in 1947 and 1949, Luxembourg made their way back to the continental stage at EuroBasket 1951 in Paris. Luxembourg's first match of the tournament was against the host France, which resulted in a demoralising defeat for the national team 72–26. Ensuing the tough loss for Luxembourg, were four straight defeats for the team, to relegate them into a must win elimination game for the right to advance into the classification rounds. Luxembourg, however, would lose in a tightly contested match 45–46 against Denmark to be eliminated.

EuroBasket 1955

Following Luxembourg's dismal performance at the EuroBasket in 1951, the national team declined to enter the event in 1953, instead looked toward EuroBasket 1955 in Budapest to make amends. After a disastrous first game in the preliminary round, which saw Luxembourg completely dominated by the Soviet Union, the team was narrowly defeated in their second match against Sweden 54–53. However, in Luxembourg's final two matches of the preliminary phase, the team struggled to build upon their game against Sweden; and were relegated toward the classification rounds at a record of (0–5).

Entering the classification round, Luxembourg dropped their first match against Turkey, before earning their first win of the tournament against Denmark 46–31. Luxembourg would eventually go on to pickup two more victories, both against Sweden to end the tournament 15th out of the 18 teams at the event.

Subsequent years
After Luxembourg's last appearance at the EuroBasket in 1951, the national team endured numerous failed qualifying cycles in order to make it back to the EuroBasket. However, Luxembourg eventually achieved success competing at smaller competitions such as the European Championship for Small Countries and the Games of the Small States of Europe.

Entering qualification for Luxembourg to reach EuroBasket 2017, the team struggled toward a (1–5) record during the process to being eliminated. After Luxembourg's missed opportunity to qualify for the 2017 tournament, the team was tasked with going through Pre-Qualifiers with a chance to qualify for EuroBasket 2022. Luxembourg would get off to a slow start during the first round of pre-qualifiers, losing their first three matches before picking up a needed win on the road against Cyprus 89–76. With a record of (1–3), Luxembourg's path of advancing took a detour, as the team was relegated to the third and final phase of pre-qualifiers. There, Luxembourg would only win one game during that qualifying window (1–3), at home against Kosovo 88–80 and failing to advance.

For Luxembourg's process to qualify for the 2023 FIBA World Cup, the national team took part in European Pre-Qualifiers, where they went (2–4) in the first round; and were initially eliminated. Although due to Austria withdrawing from qualification, Luxembourg were next inline to replace them. Entering the second and final phase of World Cup European pre-qualifiers, Luxembourg's qualification campaign officially came to a close, after posting an (0–4) record during the round.

Competitive record

FIBA World Cup

Olympic Games

Games of the Small States of Europe

EuroBasket

Championship for Small Countries

Results and fixtures

2020

2021

2022

Team

Current roster
Roster for the EuroBasket 2025 Pre-Qualifiers match on 30 June 2022 against Romania.

Depth chart

Head coach position
 Carsten Steiner – (2003–2009)
 Frank Baum – (2010–2013)
 Karsten Schul – (2013–2014)
 Franck Mériguet – (2014–2015)
 Ken Diederich – (2015–present)

Past rosters
1946 EuroBasket: finished 8th among 10 teams

3 Alfred Achen, 4 René Bicheler, 5 René Colling, 6 Henri Heyart, 7 Pierre Kelsen, 8 Eugene Kohn, 9 Léon Konsbruck, 10 Joseph Linck, 11 Gaston Poncin, 12 Roger Scheuren (Coach: Henri Heyart)

1951 EuroBasket: finished 17th among 18 teams

3 Guy Neumann, 4 Mathias Steffen, 5 Xander Frantz, 6 Fernand Schmalen, 7 Roger Dentzer, 8 Joseph Eyschen, 9 Marcel Gales, 10 Mathias Birel, 11 Jean Guillen, 12 Pierre Steinmetz, 13 Léon Konsbruck, 14 René Haas, 15 Ley, 25 Paul Linster (Coach: Pierrot Conter)

1955 EuroBasket: finished 15th among 18 teams

3 Pierre Steinmetz, 4 Mathias Birel, 5 Fernand Wolter, 6 Joseph Lettal, 7 Paul Kemp, 8 Fernand Schmalen, 9 John Kieffer, 10 Marcel Simon, 11 Florent Lickes, 12 Gust Scharle, 13 Albert Meyers, 14 Jean Christophory (Coach: Pierre Kelsen)

See also

Sport in Luxembourg
Luxembourg women's national basketball team
Luxembourg men's national under-20 basketball team
Luxembourg men's national under-18 basketball team
Luxembourg men's national under-16 basketball team

Notes

References

External links

Official website
Luxembourg FIBA profile
Luxembourg National Team – Men at Eurobasket.com
Luxembourg Basketball Records at FIBA Archive

Men's national basketball teams
Basketball in Luxembourg
Basketball teams in Luxembourg
Basketball
1946 establishments in Luxembourg